The Batavia Traction Company was an electric streetcar railway that served the city of Batavia, New York. The tracks were intended to be part of a larger system connecting Buffalo and Rochester. Built by the Buffalo and Williamsville Electric Railway, the 2.3-mile line opened for business in 1903. Any ideas for expansion were soon forgotten, and the line was sold to the Batavia Traction Company in 1914. Struggling for many years, the line finally shut down on June 12, 1927.

References

Streetcars in New York (state)
Defunct New York (state) railroads
Railway companies established in 1914
Railway companies disestablished in 1927